National Aerospace University – "Kharkiv Aviation Institute" , NAU "KhAI"  (ХАІ; KhAI) is a university in Kharkiv, Ukraine which specializes in aviation and space engineering. The KhAI was founded in 1930.

History

The NAU "KhAI" was founded in 1930 on the basis of aviation division of the Kharkiv Polytechnic Institute. In 1941-44 it was evacuated to Kazan.

Its history is closely connected with the development of aircraft engineering and science in the Soviet Union. The university is famous for its creation of the first in Europe high-speed airplane with a retractable landing gear and the creation of the design of the turbojet engine developed by teacher of the KhAI A. M. Liulka who afterwards became the academician and designer of many structures of aircraft engines including the engine of the aircraft Su-27.

The KhAI is a unique higher educational institution where the airplanes developed by the Institute Design Bureau under the supervision of professor I. G. Neman were produced serially at the aircraft plants and run on passenger airlines.

From 1977 to 1984 the Designer General O.K. Antonov ran the department of airplane structure at the KhAI.

In 1978 the KhAI was given the name of N. Ye. Zhukovskiy. In 1980 the institute was awarded with the order of Lenin. In 1998 the N. Ye. Zhukovskiy State Aerospace University “Kharkiv Aviation Institute” was founded on the basis of the KhAI and in 2000 the University got a status of the National higher education institution and was renamed the National Aerospace University ″Kharkiv Aviation Institute″.

Students

The University has trained about 53 000 engineers. More than 80% of the specialists with higher education who work in Ukrainian aerospace area are the graduates of the NAU KhAI.

At present about 7000 students and 160 post-graduate students are trained at the university; 700 teachers and 2000 employers work here. Among them there are 95 professors and doctors of science, more than 400 associate professors and candidates of sciences. Among the teachers of the university there is 1 USSR State Lenin Prize winner, 3 USSR State Prize winners, 25 Ukraine State Prize winners, 11 USSR Council of Ministers Prize winners.

In 1992 the KhAI resumed the training of foreign students. Over 1000 foreign citizens from 40 countries of Asia, Africa and America are trained annually at the University.

Faculties
 Faculty of Aircraft Engineering
 Faculty of Aircraft Engines'
 Faculty of Aircraft Control Systems
 Faculty of Rocket and Space Engineering
 Faculty of Aircraft Radio electronic Systems
 Faculty of Economics and Management
 Faculty of Humanities
 Faculty for International Students

Programmes
 Bachelor's degree – 4 years
 Specialist Degree – 1/1.5 years (depends on the specific training programme) after B.Sc.
 Master's degree – 1.5/2 years (depends on the specific training programme) after B.Sc.
 Candidate of Science (Ph.D.) – 3 years after M.Sc. or Specialist Degree
 Doctor of Science – 3 years after Ph.D.

Languages
The majority of NAU KhAI Training Programmes are provided in Ukrainian and Russian. But NAU KHAI also have a set of International Oriented Studies (IOS) Bachelor's and Master's of Science Programmes in English (full list you can find on Official website). For international students NAU KHAI has 1-month Training Programme at the Preparatory Department for further study at University in Russian.

Memberships and programs

 European and Global International Associations and Communities (International Association of Universities (IAU/UNESCO), European Group of Aeronautics and Space Universities (PEGASUS), The Magna Charta of the European Universities, International Association of Technical Universities from CIS Countries, Academic Association of CIS Countries Higher Education, European Aeronautic Science Network (EASN))
 Bilateral cooperation (Technion Research and Development Foundation LTD (Israel)
 EU Framework Programmes
 TEMPUS Programme
 Dual Degree Programmes with World Leading Universities
 Working and Training Abroad for KhAI Students and Staff
 Educational Programmes for Foreign Citizens

Aircraft designs
From:

 Kharkiv KhAI-1
 Kharkiv KhAI-2 (1932)
 Kharkiv KhAI-2 (1934)
 Kharkiv KhAI-2 (1937)
 Kharkiv KhAI-4 Iskra
 Kharkiv KhAI-5 (R-10/PS-5)
 Kharkiv KhAI-6
 Kharkiv KhAI-8
 Kharkiv KhAI-11
 Kharkiv KhAI-12 Start
 Kharkiv KhAI-13 Gymnast
 Kharkiv KhAI-14 Orlyonok
 Kharkiv KhAI-17
 Kharkiv KhAI-18
 Kharkiv KhAI-19
 Kharkiv KhAI-20
 Kharkiv KhAI-21
 Kharkiv KhAI-22
 Kharkiv KhAI-23
 Kharkiv KhAI-24
 Kharkiv KhAI-25
 Kharkiv KhAI-25
 Kharkiv KhAI-26
 Kharkiv KhAI-27 Kharkovchanin
 Kharkiv KhAI-28
 Kharkiv KhAI-29 Korshun
 Kharkiv KhAI-30 Professor Nyeman
 Kharkiv KhAI-31
 Kharkiv KhAI-32
 Kharkiv KhAI-33
 Kharkiv KhAI-34
 Kharkiv KhAI-35 Entuziast
 Kharkiv KhAI-36
 Kharkiv KhAI-37 Mikhail Efimov
 Kharkiv KhAI-38
 Kharkiv KhAI-39
 Kharkiv KhAI-40
 Kharkiv KhAI-41
 Kharkiv KhAI-42
 Kharkiv KhAI-43
 Kharkiv KhAI-44
 Kharkiv KhAI-45
 Kharkiv KhAI-46
 Kharkiv KhAI-47
 Kharkiv KhAI-48
 Kharkiv KhAI-49
 Kharkiv KhAI-51
 Kharkiv KhAI-52
 Kharkiv KhAI-60 (60 let KhAI)
 Kharkiv KhAI-70
 Kharkiv KhAI-80
 Kharkiv KhAI-90
 Kharkiv KhAI-92
 Kharkiv KhAI-112
 Kharkiv KhAI-150

References

External links
 Official website for International students
 Research cooperation
 Aerospace Research and Education at NAU KhAI

Technical universities and colleges in Ukraine
Aerospace engineering organizations
Educational institutions established in 1930
Buildings and structures in Kharkiv
Universities and colleges in Kharkiv
1930 establishments in Ukraine
Aviation schools in Ukraine
 
Kharkiv Polytechnic Institute
Kyivskyi District (Kharkiv)
National universities in Ukraine
Kharkiv Aviation Institute aircraft
Universities and institutes established in the Soviet Union
Aviation in the Soviet Union
Institutions with the title of National in Ukraine